Kotoko may refer to:

 Kotoko (musician), a Japanese singer
 Kotoko (film), a Japanese film
 Kotoko, a character from Chobits
 The Kotoko kingdom of West Africa
 The Kotoko languages of West Africa
 The Kotoko people of West Africa
 Asante Kotoko, a top Ghanaian football club sometimes called Kotoko for short.
 Kotoko F.C. a Togolese football club